Betty Abah (born March 6, 1974) is a Nigerian journalist, author and a women and children's rights activist. She is the founder and Executive director of CEE HOPE, a girl-child rights and development non-profit organization based in Lagos State

Early life
Betty was born in Otukpo, Benue State, Middle Belt region of Nigeria. She obtained a first degree in English and literary studies from the University of Calabar in1999 and a masters degree in English literature from the University of Lagos in 2012

Career
Betty first worked with The Voice Newspaper in Makurdi, Benue State, and then Newswatch and Tell Magazine, before she proceeded to work with Rocky Mountain News as a fellow of the Alfred Friendly Press Fellowships. As a journalist, she practised with The Voice Newspaper, Newswatch, Tell Magazine and she also had a stint with the Rocky Mountain News in Denver, Colorado, US. She is the author of Sound of Broken Chains, Go Tell Our King and Mother of Multitudes. Betty worked with Environmental Rights Action; Friends of the Earth Nigeria before setting establishing CEE-HOPE in December 2013.

Activism
Abah has been involved in several cases, defending cases of human rights violations. Some of them include campaigns for the release of the Chibok girls abducted by the Boko Haram terrorist in North East Nigeria, campaigns for the environmental rights of Niger Delta women, the case of the torture involving three women in Ejigbo, Lagos by members of a vigilante group, the case of the kidnapping of Ese Oruru among others. In 2019, on the Menstrual Hygiene Day event held at Lagos, Betty advocated for the free distribution of sanitary pads to woman and girls, reasoning that since government gives free condoms for sex, sanitary pads should also be made available for the needy women and girls.

Awards, recognitions and fellowships

References

External links

1974 births
Living people
Nigerian women writers
People from Benue State
Nigerian activists
Nigerian women's rights activists
Nigerian women activists
University of Calabar alumni
University of Lagos alumni
Nigerian human rights activists
Nigerian women journalists